is a professional Japanese baseball player. He is a pitcher for the Hiroshima Toyo Carp of Nippon Professional Baseball (NPB).

References 

1999 births
Living people
Nippon Professional Baseball pitchers
Baseball people from Nara Prefecture
Hiroshima Toyo Carp players